Tonye T. Patano (born October 16, 1961) is an American actress. She may be best known as Heylia James on the television series Weeds.

She has appeared in television shows such as Law & Order, Sex and the City, Monk and Third Watch. Patano was in the original cast of the Broadway play, 45 Seconds from Broadway by Neil Simon.

Career

Film and television
Patano's first screen role was in the 1984 television film The Jesse Owens Story. She has appeared on several television series in guest roles, including Sex and the City, Monk, Third Watch, Curb Your Enthusiasm and Elementary. Patano has played various characters throughout the Law & Order franchise.

She appeared as Carolyn in Highway Heartbreaker (1992), and had a small role in A Price Above Rubies (1998). Other film work includes Little Manhattan and The Great New Wonderful, both released in 2005.

In 2005, Patano landed the role of Heylia James, a marijuana dealer, on Weeds. She received a Screen Actors Guild Award nomination for Outstanding Performance by an Ensemble in a Comedy Series alongside her Weeds co-stars in 2006. Two years later, Patano earned an NAACP Image Award nomination for Outstanding Supporting Actress in a Comedy Series as Heylia. Patano left the series at the conclusion of its third season, later returning in season 7 on a recurring basis.

Following Weeds, she portrayed Emily in Hallmark movie Loving Leah (2009). Patano was Beverly, a counselor, in A Vigilante (2018). She played a probation officer in drama Jack of the Red Hearts (2015).

Stage
Patano portrayed Nurse O'Neil in a 1997 production of The Sunshine Boys at the George Street Playhouse. One reviewer claimed she was "excellent" in the role. In 2000, she received a Connecticut Critics Circle Award for best ensemble after acting in From the Mississippi Delta. Patano appeared on Broadway as Ms. Gravátt in 45 Seconds from Broadway (2001).

She played the role of brothel owner Mama Nadi in Ruined for the Huntington Theater. Her performance in this production received positive reception, with one critic calling her "delightful" and "magnetic." Another found her superb in the role of Mama Nadi.

Personal life
At age 35, she was diagnosed with diabetes, and she suffered a stroke in 2005.

Filmography

Films

Television

References

External links

1961 births
Living people
Actresses from Los Angeles
20th-century American actresses
21st-century American actresses
American television actresses
African-American actresses
American film actresses
American stage actresses
American soap opera actresses
20th-century African-American women
20th-century African-American people
21st-century African-American women
21st-century African-American people